Ayu or AYU may refer to:
 Ayu (given name)
 Ayu sweetfish (Plecoglossus altivelis), a species of smelt
 Ayu, a local name for the African manatee
 Ayu (singer) or Ayumi Hamasaki, Japanese singer
 Ayu Islands, a small archipelago in Indonesia
 Ayu, Dawei, a village in Burma
 Ayu language, a language of Nigeria
 Aiyura Airport, IATA code AYU

See also 
 Ayu-Dag, a peak in Crimea, Ukraine
 Ayumi, a Japanese name